Batchelor may refer to:

Batchelor, Northern Territory, Australia, a town
Batchelor, Louisiana, United States, an unincorporated community
Batchelor (surname), people with the surname

See also
 Batchelors, a food brand
 Bachelor, an unmarried man 
 Louis Bachelier (1870–1946), French mathematician
 Bachelor (disambiguation)
 The Bachelors (disambiguation)